Staroakbulatovo (İśke Aqbulat) is a rural locality (a selo) and the administrative centre of Akbulatovsky Selsoviet, Tatyshlinsky District, Bashkortostan, Russia. The population was 426 as of 2010. There are 10 streets.

Geography 
Staroakbulatovo is located 43 km southwest of Verkhniye Tatyshly (the district's administrative centre) by road. Savaleyevo is the nearest rural locality.

References 

Rural localities in Tatyshlinsky District